Papilio godeffroyi, the Godeffroy's swallowtail, (Samoan ) is a butterfly of the family Papilionidae.

Papilio godeffroyi is endemic to all of Samoa, but it is now found only on the island of Tutuila, where it is uncommon but widespread and restricted to undisturbed or near-undisturbed rainforest. This is only around 5% of its original range, and the species has recently been submitted to the IUCN Red List as critically endangered.

The larva feeds on Micromelum minutum (Rutaceae), locally called talafalu.

The species, named to honour Johann Cesar VI. Godeffroy, is illustrated on a Samoan postage stamp issued on 14 December 2001.

See also
Samoan tropical moist forests

References
Hopkins, G. 1927. Butterflies of Samoa and Some Neighboring Island-groups. Insects of Samoa. Part III. Fascicle 1. London: Bishop Museum Natural History, pp 1–64.

godeffroyi
Butterflies of Oceania
Endemic fauna of Samoa
Invertebrates of American Samoa
Tutuila
Butterflies described in 1866
Taxa named by Georg Semper